American Airlines Flight 77 was a scheduled American Airlines domestic transcontinental passenger flight from Washington Dulles International Airport in Virginia to Los Angeles International Airport in California. The Boeing 757-223 aircraft serving the flight was hijacked by five al-Qaeda terrorists on the morning of September 11, 2001, as part of the September 11 attacks. The hijackers deliberately crashed the plane into the Pentagon in Arlington County, Virginia, killing all 64 aboard and another 125 in the building. Flight 77 was the third of four aircraft to be hijacked by terrorists on September 11, and the last to successfully reach a target intended by al-Qaeda, as United Airlines Flight 93―similarly poised to strike a federal government building nearby―crashed en route to Washington, D.C.

Thirty-one minutes after takeoff, the attackers stormed the cockpit and forced the passengers and crew to the rear of the cabin, threatening the hostages but initially sparing all of them. Lead hijacker Hani Hanjour assumed control of the aircraft after having undergone extensive flight training as part of his preparation for the mission, while, in the meantime, two people aboard discreetly made phone calls to family members and relayed information on the situation without the knowledge of their assailants.

Hanjour flew the airplane into the western side of the Pentagon at 09:37 ET. Many people witnessed the impact, and news sources began reporting on the incident within minutes, but no clear footage of the crash itself is available to the public. The plane severely damaged an area of the Pentagon and caused a large fire that took several days to extinguish; within 33 minutes of the attack, a portion of the building collapsed, followed forty minutes later by another five stories of the structure.

The damaged sections of the Pentagon were rebuilt in 2002, with occupants moving back into the completed areas that August. The 184 victims of the attack are memorialized in the Pentagon Memorial adjacent to the crash site. The  park contains a bench for each of the victims, arranged according to their year of birth.

Hijackers

The hijackers on American Airlines Flight77 were five Saudi men between the ages of 20 and 29. They were led by Hani Hanjour, who piloted the aircraft into the Pentagon. Hanjour first arrived in the United States in 1990.

Hanjour trained at the CRM Airline Training Center in Scottsdale, Arizona, earning his FAA commercial pilot's certificate in April 1999. He had wanted to be a commercial pilot for Saudia but was rejected when he applied to the civil aviation school in Jeddah in 1999. Hanjour's brother later explained that, frustrated at not finding a job, Hanjour "increasingly turned his attention toward religious texts and cassette tapes of militant Islamic preachers." Hanjour returned to Saudi Arabia after being certified as a pilot, but left again in late 1999, telling his family he was going to the United Arab Emirates to work for an airline. Hanjour likely went to Afghanistan, where Al-Qaeda recruits were screened for special skills they might have. Already having selected the Hamburg cell members, Al Qaeda leaders selected Hanjour to lead the fourth team of hijackers.

In December 2000, Hanjour arrived in San Diego, joining "muscle" hijackers Nawaf al-Hazmi and Khalid al-Mihdhar, who had been there since January of that year. Alec Station, the CIA's unit dedicated to tracking Osama bin Laden, had discovered that al-Hazmi and al-Mihdhar had multiple-entry visas to the United States. An FBI agent inside the unit and his supervisor Mark Rossini (Former Federal Bureau of Investigation Supervisory Agent) sought to alert FBI headquarters, but the CIA officer supervising Rossini at Alec Station rebuffed him on the grounds that the FBI lacked jurisdiction.

Soon after arriving in San Diego, Hanjour and Hazmi left for Mesa, Arizona, where Hanjour began refresher training at Arizona Aviation. In April 2001, they relocated to Falls Church, Virginia, where they awaited the arrival of the remaining "muscle" hijackers. One of these men, Majed Moqed, arrived on May 2, 2001, with Flight175 hijacker Ahmed al-Ghamdi from Dubai at Dulles International Airport. They moved into an apartment with Hazmi and Hanjour.

On May 21, 2001, Hanjour rented a room in Paterson, New Jersey, where he stayed with other hijackers through the end of August. The last Flight77 "muscle" hijacker, Salem al-Hazmi, arrived on June 29, 2001, with Abdulaziz al-Omari (a hijacker of Flight11) at John F. Kennedy International Airport from the United Arab Emirates. They stayed with Hanjour.

Hanjour received ground instruction and did practice flights at Air Fleet Training Systems in Teterboro, New Jersey, and at Caldwell Flight Academy in Fairfield, New Jersey. Hanjour moved out of the room in Paterson and arrived at the Valencia Motel in Laurel, Maryland, on September 2, 2001. While in Maryland, Hanjour and fellow hijackers trained at Gold's Gym in Greenbelt. On September 10, he completed a certification flight, using a terrain recognition system for navigation, at Congressional Air Charters in Gaithersburg, Maryland.

On September 10 Nawaf al-Hazmi, accompanied by other hijackers, checked into the Marriott in Herndon, Virginia, near Dulles Airport.

Suspected accomplices

According to a U.S. State Department cable leaked in the WikiLeaks dump in February 2010, the FBI has investigated another suspect, Mohammed al-Mansoori. He had associated with three Qatari citizens who flew from Los Angeles to London (via Washington) and Qatar on the eve of the attacks, after allegedly surveying the World Trade Center and the White House. U.S. law enforcement officials said the data about the four men was "just one of many leads that were thoroughly investigated at the time and never led to terrorism charges." An official added that the three Qatari citizens had never been questioned by the FBI. Eleanor Hill, the former staff director for the congressional joint inquiry on the September 11 attacks, said the cable reinforces questions about the thoroughness of the FBI's investigation. She also said that the inquiry concluded the hijackers had a support network that helped them in different ways.

The three Qatari men were booked to fly from Los Angeles to Washington on September 10, 2001, on the same plane that was hijacked and piloted into the Pentagon on the following day. Instead, they flew from Los Angeles to Qatar, via Washington and London. While the cable said Mansoori was currently under investigation, U.S. law enforcement officials said there was no active investigation of him or of the Qatari citizens mentioned in the cable.

Flight

The aircraft involved in the hijacking was a Boeing 757-223 (registration  The aircraft was built and had its first flight in 1991 and delivered to American Airlines in May 1991. The crew included Captain Charles Burlingame (51) (a Naval Academy graduate and former fighter pilot), First Officer David Charlebois (39), purser Renee May and flight attendants Michele Heidenberger, Jennifer Lewis and Kenneth Lewis. The capacity of the aircraft was 188 passengers, but with 58 passengers on September 11, the load factor was 33 percent. American Airlines said Tuesdays were the least-traveled day of the week, with the same load factor seen on Tuesdays in the previous three months for Flight77.

Boarding and departure
On the morning of September 11, 2001, the five hijackers arrived at Washington Dulles International Airport. At 07:15 AM ET, Khalid al-Mihdhar and Majed Moqed checked in at the American Airlines ticket counter for Flight77, arriving at the passenger security checkpoint a few minutes later at 07:18. Both men set off the metal detector and were put through secondary screening. Moqed continued to set off the alarm, so he was searched with a hand wand. The Hazmi brothers checked in together at the ticket counter at 07:29. Hani Hanjour checked in separately and arrived at the passenger security checkpoint at 07:35. Hanjour was followed minutes later at the checkpoint by Salem and Nawaf al-Hazmi, who also set off the metal detector's alarm. The screener at the checkpoint never resolved what set off the alarm. As seen in security footage later released, Nawaf al-Hazmi appeared to have an unidentified item in his back pocket. Utility knives up to four inches were permitted at the time by the Federal Aviation Administration (FAA) as carry-on items. The passenger security checkpoint at Dulles International Airport was operated by Argenbright Security, under contract with United Airlines.

The hijackers were all selected for extra screening of their checked bags. Hanjour, al-Mihdhar, and Moqed were chosen by the Computer Assisted Passenger Prescreening System (CAPPS) criteria, while the brothers Nawaf and Salem al-Hazmi were selected because they did not provide adequate identification and were deemed suspicious by the airline check-in agent. Hanjour, Mihdhar, and Nawaf al-Hazmi did not check any bags for the flight. Checked bags belonging to Moqed and Salem al-Hazmi were held until they boarded the aircraft.

Flight 77 was scheduled to depart for Los Angeles at 08:10; 58 passengers boarded through Gate D26, including the five hijackers. The 53 other passengers on board excluding the hijackers were 26 men, 22 women, and five children ranging in age from three to eleven. On the flight, Hani Hanjour was seated up front in 1B, while Salem and Nawaf al-Hazmi were likewise seated in first class, in seats 5E and 5F. Majed Moqed and Khalid al-Mihdhar were seated farther back in 12A and 12B, in economy class. Flight77 left the gate on time and took off from Runway 30 at Dulles at 08:20. The attacks were already underway by this point, as American Airlines Flight 11 had been hijacked six minutes earlier. Shortly after Flight 77 became airborne, FAA flight controller Danielle O'Brien made a routine handoff of the flight to a colleague at the FAA's Indianapolis Center. For reasons she couldn't explain and would never fully understand, O'Brien didn't use one of her normal sendoffs to the pilots: "Good day," or "Have a nice flight." Instead, she wished them, "Good luck."

By 8:46 a.m., Flight 77 reached its assigned cruising altitude of 35,000 feet, in the same minute Flight 11 was crashed into the North Tower of the World Trade Center.

Hijacking

The 9/11 Commission estimated that the flight was hijacked between 08:51 and 08:54, shortly after the North Tower was struck and not too long after United Airlines Flight 175 had been hijacked. The last normal radio communications from the aircraft to air traffic control occurred at 08:50:51. The methodology of Flight 77's hijacking was noticeably different from the other three flights, in that while the victims were threatened with knives and box cutters, there were no reports of anyone actually being injured or killed prior to the crash, nor was the use of mace and bomb threats mentioned in any phone calls made from the flight. Notably, when the cockpit was breached, the terrorists did not kill or incapacitate the pilots, but instead sent them to the back of the plane with the rest of the passengers. At 08:54, as the plane flew in the vicinity over Pike County, Ohio, it began deviating from its normal assigned flight path and turned south. Two minutes later, the plane's transponder was switched off. The hijackers set the flight's autopilot on a course pointing due east in the direction of Washington, D.C.

The FAA was aware at this point there was an emergency on board the airplane. After learning of a second hijacking involving an American Airlines aircraft and the hijacking of a United Airlines jet, American Airlines' executive vice president Gerard Arpey ordered a nationwide ground stop for the airline. The Indianapolis Air Route Traffic Control Center, as well as American Airlines dispatchers, made several failed attempts to contact the aircraft. At the time the airplane was hijacked, it was flying over an area of limited radar coverage. With air controllers unable to contact the flight by radio, an Indianapolis official declared that it had possibly crashed at 09:09, 28 minutes before it actually did.

Calls
Two people on board the aircraft made phone calls to contacts on the ground. At 09:12, flight attendant Renee May made a phone call lasting just under two minutes to her mother, Nancy May, in Las Vegas. During the phone call, May erroneously said her flight "was being hijacked by six persons" who had forced "us" to the rear of the airplane. She did not explain whether the people crowded together were crew members, passengers, or both. May asked her mother to contact American Airlines, which she and her husband promptly did, although the company was well-aware of the hijacking by this point. At 09:16, passenger Barbara Olson made a call to her husband, United States Solicitor General Theodore Olson, reporting that the airplane had been hijacked and the assailants were armed with knives and box cutters. She revealed that everyone, including the pilots, had been moved to the back of the cabin and that the call was being made without the knowledge of the hostage takers. The connection dropped a minute into the conversation. Theodore Olson contacted the command center at the Department of Justice, and tried unsuccessfully to contact Attorney General John Ashcroft. Five minutes later, Barbara Olson called again, informing her husband that the "pilot" had announced the flight was hijacked. Who she was referring to when using the term “pilot” is unclear, but since the crew were spared it has been speculated that it could have either been one of the actual pilots or Hani Hanjour, who may have made announcements over the cabin's PA system without making the mistake of broadcasting his messages to controllers on the ground by keying the wrong switch, an error made by Mohamed Atta and Ziad Jarrah on Flights 11 and 93 respectively. Olson asked her husband, "What do I tell the pilot to do?" Inquired of her whereabouts, Barbara replied saying that they were flying low over a residential area. In the background, Ted overheard another passenger mentioning that the plane was flying northeast. He then made his wife aware of the suicide attacks on the World Trade Center, causing her to go quiet; Ted wondered if this meant she had been shocked into silence. After expressing their feelings and reassuring one another, the call cut off for the last time, at 9:26 a.m.

Crash

 At 9:29 a.m., one minute after United Airlines Flight 93 was hijacked, the terrorists aboard Flight 77 disengaged the autopilot and took manual control of the plane. Turning and descending rapidly as it made its final approach toward Washington, the airplane was detected again on radar screens by controllers at Dulles, who mistook it for a military fighter at first glance due to its high speed and maneuvering.

By the end of the revolution, the 757 was descending , pointed toward the Pentagon and downtown Washington. Advancing the throttles to full power, Hanjour rapidly began diving toward his target. The wings clipped five street lights as the plane flew level above the ground, while the right wing in particular struck a portable generator, creating a smoke trail seconds before smashing into the Pentagon.

The plane struck the establishment at the first-floor level and was rolled slightly to the left, with the right wing elevated as it crashed. The front part of the fuselage immediately disintegrated upon impact, while the mid and tail sections continued moving for another fraction of a second, with tail section debris penetrating farthest into the building.

In the minutes leading up to the crash, Reagan Airport controllers had asked a passing Air National Guard Lockheed C-130 Hercules to identify and follow the aircraft. The pilot, Lieutenant Colonel Steven O'Brien, told them he believed it was either a Boeing757 or 767, observing that its silver fuselage meant it was most likely an American Airlines jet. O'Brien mentioned having difficulty picking out the airplane in the "East Coast haze", but moments later reported seeing a "huge" fireball. His initial assumption as he approached the crash site was that the plane had simply hit the ground, but upon closer inspection he saw the damage done to the Pentagon's west side and relayed to Reagan control, "Looks like that aircraft crashed into the Pentagon, sir."

At the time of the attacks, approximately 18,000 people worked in the Pentagon, 4,000 fewer than before renovations began in 1998. The section of the Pentagon that was struck, which had recently been renovated at a cost of $250million, housed the Naval Command Center.

In all, there were 189 deaths at the Pentagon site, including 125 in the Pentagon building in addition to the 64 on board the aircraft. Passenger Barbara Olson was en route to a recording of the TV show Politically Incorrect. A group of three 11-year-old children, their chaperones, and two National Geographic Society staff members were also on board, embarking on an educational trip west to the Channel Islands National Marine Sanctuary near Santa Barbara, California.

The fatalities at the Pentagon included 55 military personnel and 70 civilians. Of those 125 killed, 92 were on the first floor, 31 were on the second floor, and two were on the third. Seven Defense Intelligence Agency civilian employees were killed while the Office of the Secretary of Defense lost one contractor. The U.S. Army suffered 75 fatalities53 civilians (47 employees and six contractors) and 22 soldierswhile the U.S. Navy suffered 42 fatalitiesnine civilians (six employees and three contractors) and 33 sailors. Lieutenant General Timothy Maude, an Army deputy chief of staff, was the highest-ranking military officer killed at the Pentagon; also killed was retired Rear Admiral Wilson Flagg, a passenger on the plane. LT Mari-Rae Sopper, JAGC, USNR, was also on board the flight, and was the first Navy Judge Advocate ever to be killed in action. Another 106 were injured on the ground and were treated at area hospitals.

On the side where the plane hit, the Pentagon is bordered by Interstate 395 and Washington Boulevard. Motorist Mary Lyman, who was on I-395, saw the airplane pass over at a "steep angle toward the ground and going fast" and then saw the cloud of smoke from the Pentagon. Omar Campo, another witness, was on the other side of the road:

Afework Hagos, a computer programmer, was on his way to work and stuck in a traffic jam near the Pentagon when the airplane flew over. "There was a huge screaming noise and I got out of the car as the plane came over. Everybody was running away in different directions. It was tilting its wings up and down like it was trying to balance. It hit some lampposts on the way in." Daryl Donley witnessed the crash and took some of the first photographs of the site.

USA Today reporter Mike Walter was driving on Washington Boulevard when he witnessed the crash:

Terrance Kean, who lived in a nearby apartment building, heard the noise of loud jet engines, glanced out his window, and saw a "very, very large passenger jet". He watched "it just plow right into the side of the Pentagon. The nose penetrated into the portico. And then it sort of disappeared, and there was fire and smoke everywhere." Tim Timmerman, who is a pilot himself, noticed American Airlines markings on the aircraft as he saw it hit the Pentagon. Other drivers on Washington Boulevard, Interstate 395, and Columbia Pike witnessed the crash, as did people in Pentagon City, Crystal City, and other nearby locations.

Former Georgetown University basketball coach John Thompson had originally booked a ticket on Flight77. As he would tell the story many times in the following years, including a September 12, 2011 interview on Jim Rome's radio show, he had been scheduled to appear on that show on September 12, 2001. Thompson was planning to be in Las Vegas for a friend's birthday on September 13, and initially insisted on traveling to Rome's Los Angeles studio on the 11th. However, this did not work for the show, which wanted him to travel on the day of the show. After a Rome staffer personally assured Thompson he would be able to travel from Los Angeles to Las Vegas immediately after the show, Thompson changed his travel plans. He felt the impact from the crash at his home near the Pentagon.

Rescue and recovery

Rescue efforts began immediately after the crash. Almost all the successful rescues of survivors occurred within half an hour of the impact. Initially, rescue efforts were led by the military and civilian employees within the building. Within minutes, the first fire companies arrived and found these volunteers searching near the impact site. The firemen ordered them to leave as they were not properly equipped or trained to deal with the hazards.

The Arlington County Fire Department (ACFD) assumed command of the immediate rescue operation within ten minutes of the crash. ACFD Assistant Chief James Schwartz implemented an incident command system (ICS) to coordinate response efforts among multiple agencies. It took about an hour for the ICS structure to become fully operational. Firefighters from Fort Myer and Reagan National Airport arrived within minutes. Rescue and firefighting efforts were impeded by rumors of additional incoming planes. Chief Schwartz ordered two evacuations during the day in response to these rumors.

As firefighters attempted to extinguish the fires, they watched the building in fear of a structural collapse. One firefighter remarked that they "pretty much knew the building was going to collapse because it started making weird sounds and creaking." Officials saw a cornice of the building move and ordered an evacuation. Minutes later, at 10:10, the upper floors of the damaged area of the Pentagon collapsed. The amount of time between impact and collapse allowed everyone on the fourth and fifth levels to evacuate safely before the structure collapsed. After 11:00, firefighters mounted a two-pronged attack against the fires. While progress was made against the interior fires by late afternoon, firefighters realized a flammable layer of wood under the Pentagon's slate roof had caught fire and begun to spread. Typical firefighting tactics were rendered useless by the reinforced structure as firefighters were unable to reach the fire to extinguish it. Firefighters instead made firebreaks in the roof on September 12 to prevent further spreading. At 18:00 on the 12th, Arlington County issued a press release stating the fire was "controlled" but not fully "extinguished". Firefighters continued to put out smaller fires that ignited in the succeeding days.

Various pieces of aircraft debris were found within the wreckage at the Pentagon. While on fire and escaping from the Navy Command Center, Lt. Kevin Shaeffer observed a chunk of the aircraft's nose cone and the nose landing gear in the service road between rings B and C. Early in the morning on Friday, September 14, Fairfax County Urban Search and Rescue Team members Carlton Burkhammer and Brian Moravitz came across an "intact seat from the plane's cockpit", while paramedics and firefighters located the two black boxes near the punch out hole in the A–E drive, nearly  into the building. The cockpit voice recorder was too badly damaged and charred to retrieve any information, though the flight data recorder yielded useful information. Investigators also found a part of Nawaf al-Hazmi's driver's license in the North Parking Lot rubble pile. Personal effects belonging to victims were found and taken to Fort Myer.

Remains

Army engineers determined by 17:30 on the first day that no survivors remained in the damaged section of the building. In the days after the crash, news reports emerged that up to 800 people had died. Army soldiers from Fort Belvoir were the first teams to survey the interior of the crash site and noted the presence of human remains. Federal Emergency Management Agency (FEMA) Urban Search and Rescue teams, including Fairfax County Urban Search and Rescue assisted the search for remains, working through the National Interagency Incident Management System (NIIMS). Kevin Rimrodt, a Navy photographer surveying the Navy Command Center after the attacks, remarked that "there were so many bodies, I'd almost step on them. So I'd have to really take care to look backwards as I'm backing up in the dark, looking with a flashlight, making sure I'm not stepping on somebody." Debris from the Pentagon was taken to the Pentagon's north parking lot for more detailed search for remains and evidence.

Remains recovered from the Pentagon were photographed, and turned over to the Armed Forces Medical Examiner office, located at Dover Air Force Base in Delaware. The medical examiner's office was able to identify remains belonging to 179 of the victims. Investigators eventually identified 184 of the 189 people who died in the attack. The remains of the five hijackers were identified through a process of elimination, and were turned over as evidence to the Federal Bureau of Investigation (FBI). On September 21, the ACFD relinquished control of the crime scene to the FBI. The Washington Field Office, National Capital Response Squad (NCRS), and the Joint Terrorism Task Force (JTTF) led the crime scene investigation at the Pentagon.

By October 2, 2001, the search for evidence and remains was complete and the site was turned over to Pentagon officials. In 2002, the remains of 25 victims were buried collectively at Arlington National Cemetery, with a five-sided granite marker inscribed with the names of all the victims in the Pentagon. The ceremony also honored the five victims whose remains were never found.

Flight recorders

They called for an FBI agent, who in turn called for someone from the National Transportation Safety Board (NTSB). The NTSB employee confirmed that these were the flight recorders ("black boxes") from American Airlines Flight77. Dick Bridges, deputy manager for Arlington County, Virginia, said the cockpit voice recorder was damaged on the outside and the flight data recorder was charred. Bridges said the recorders were found "right where the plane came into the building".

The cockpit voice recorder was transported to the NTSB lab in Washington, D.C., to see what data was salvageable. In its report, the NTSB identified the unit as an L-3 Communications, Fairchild Aviation Recorders model A-100A cockpit voice recordera device which records on magnetic tape. No usable segments of tape were found inside the recorder; according to the NTSB's report, "[t]he majority of the recording tape was fused into a solid block of charred plastic". On the other hand, all the data from the flight data recorder, which used a solid-state drive, was recovered.

Continuity of operations

At the moment of impact, Secretary of Defense Donald Rumsfeld was in his office on the other side of the Pentagon, away from the crash site. He ran to the site and assisted the injured. Rumsfeld returned to his office, and went to a conference room in the Executive Support Center where he joined a secure videoteleconference with Vice President Dick Cheney and other officials. On the day of the attacks, DoD officials considered moving their command operations to Site R, a backup facility in Pennsylvania. Secretary of Defense Rumsfeld insisted he remain at the Pentagon, and sent Deputy Secretary Paul Wolfowitz to Site R. The National Military Command Center (NMCC) continued to operate at the Pentagon, even as smoke entered the facility. Engineers and building managers manipulated the ventilation and other building systems that still functioned to draw smoke out of the NMCC and bring in fresh air.

During a press conference held inside the Pentagon at 18:42, Rumsfeld announced, "The Pentagon's functioning. It will be in business tomorrow." Pentagon employees returned the next day to offices in mostly unaffected areas of the building. By the end of September, more workers returned to the lightly damaged areas of the Pentagon.

Aftermath

Early estimates on rebuilding the damaged section of the Pentagon were that it would take three years to complete. However, the project moved forward at an accelerated pace and was completed by the first anniversary of the attack. The rebuilt section of the Pentagon includes a small indoor memorial and chapel at the point of impact. An outdoor memorial, commissioned by the Pentagon and designed by Julie Beckman and Keith Kaseman, was completed on schedule for its dedication on September 11, 2008. Since September 11, American Airlines continued to fly from Dulles International Airport to Los Angeles International Airport until 2020, when flights were permanently suspended. As of 2022, American Airlines operates the flight from Washington to LAX from Ronald Reagan Washington National Airport as Flight 1275 departing at 08:55 using an Airbus A321neo.

Security camera video

The Department of Defense released filmed footage on May 16, 2006, that was recorded by a security camera of American Airlines Flight77 crashing into the Pentagon, with a plane visible in one frame, as a "thin white blur" and an explosion following. The images were made public in response to a December 2004 Freedom of Information Act request by Judicial Watch. Some still images from the video had previously been released and publicly circulated, but this was the first official release of the edited video of the crash.

A nearby Citgo service station also had security cameras, but a video released on September 15, 2006, did not show the crash because the camera was pointed away from the crash site.

The Doubletree Hotel, located nearby in Crystal City, Virginia, also had a security camera video. The FBI released the video on December 4, 2006, in response to a FOIA lawsuit filed by Scott Bingham. The footage is "grainy and the focus is soft, but a rapidly growing tower of smoke is visible in the distance on the upper edge of the frame as the plane crashes into the building."

Memorials

On September 12, 2002, Defense Secretary Donald Rumsfeld and General Richard Myers, Chairman of the Joint Chiefs of Staff, dedicated the Victims of Terrorist Attack on the Pentagon Memorial at Arlington National Cemetery. The memorial specifically honors the five individuals for whom no identifiable remains were found. This included Dana Falkenberg, age three, who was aboard American Airlines Flight77 with her parents and older sister. A portion of the remains of 25 other victims are also buried at the site. On five sides of the memorial along the top are inscribed the words "Victims of Terrorist Attack on the Pentagon September 11, 2001". Aluminum plaques, painted black, are inscribed with the names of the 184 victims of the terrorist attack. The site is located in Section 64, on a slight rise, which gives it a view of the Pentagon.

At the National September 11 Memorial, the names of the Pentagon victims are inscribed on six panels at the South Pool.

The Pentagon Memorial, located just southwest of The Pentagon in Arlington County, Virginia, is a permanent outdoor memorial to the 184 people who died as victims in the building and on American Airlines Flight77 during the September11 attacks. Designed by Julie Beckman and Keith Kaseman of the architectural firm of Kaseman Beckman Advanced Strategies with engineers Buro Happold, the memorial opened on September 11, 2008, seven years after the attack.

Nationalities of victims on the aircraft

The 53 passengers (excluding the hijackers) and six crew were from:

See also

 American Airlines Flight 11 
 List of aircraft hijackings
 United Airlines Flight 175
 United Airlines Flight 93

References

External links

 Picture of Aircraft Pre 9-11
 Arlington County After-Action Report, July 23, 2002
  (September 11, 2001)
  (September 12, 2001)

 
2001 fires in the United States
2001 in Virginia
Accidents and incidents involving the Boeing 757
Aircraft hijackings in the United States
Airliner accidents and incidents caused by hijacking
Airliner accidents and incidents in Virginia
Airliner accidents and incidents involving deliberate crashes
Airliners involved in the September 11 attacks
77
Articles containing video clips
Attacks on military installations in the 2000s
Attacks in the United States in 2001
Attacks on government buildings and structures
Aviation accidents and incidents in the United States in 2001
Filmed murder–suicides
Islamic terrorism in the United States
Mass murder in Virginia
Mass murder in the United States
Murder–suicides in Virginia
Murder–suicides in the United States
Mass murder in 2001
2001 murders in the United States
Suicides in Virginia
Terrorist incidents in the United States in 2001
The Pentagon
Dulles International Airport